Ludwig Carl Moyzisch (born 1905) was a diplomatic attaché of the Nazi German Embassy in Ankara, Turkey in 1943. Under this cover, he led the work of the German secret services in Turkey, including Elyesa Bazna, codename 'Cicero'. Moyzisch wrote the book Operation Cicero in part to explain his role and activities working for the Sicherheitsdienst (SD). The book was subsequently adapted into the film 5 Fingers, starring James Mason as the spy.

Supposed photos of Elyesa Bazna and Ludwig Carl Moyzisch

Biography
Moyzisch was born in Austria, and raised under the Catholic faith. His maternal grandmother was Jewish, which made him a second degree mischling [mixed race]. Moyzisch was a journalist in Vienna prior to becoming a member of Nazi Germany's intelligence services during World War II.

Although Moyzisch had some Jewish heritage, he was still accepted into the Nazi Sicherheitsdienst (SD). This was accomplished in part by becoming a member of the Nazi party.

He had an official title of commercial attaché in Ankara, while secretly working there as SD chief. He reported to Walter Schellenberg while in Ankara during 1941–1944. Moyzisch lived in Ankara with his wife and son, but he was unable to get his mother and sister out of Germany. Schellenberg and Himmler were quite impressed by the efficient, professional, and friendly manner in which he worked. An SS officer intervened when an anonymous letter was sent to the regime stating that Moyzisch was part Jewish.

Cicero Affair

'Cicero' is the SD code name given by the Germans to Elyesa Bazna, a valet for the British ambassador Sir Hughe Knatchbull-Hugessen in the city of Ankara in Turkey, a neutral country during most part of World War II.

The information that he leaked is believed to have been potentially among the more damaging disclosures made by a Second World War spy but conflicts inside the highest echelons of the German government meant that little if any of it was acted upon.

After the war
At the end of the World War II, he was aggressively interviewed by the Allies and gave witness during war trials at Nuremberg, after which he wrote a book to address rumors and explain his role during the war. He was never charged with a war crime.

Operation Cicero
Moyzisch published his memoirs in 1950 with a book named Operation Cicero.  Richard Wires, author of The Cicero Spy Affair stated that he found the book to be a "sensational narrative" with misrepresentations and omissions. Wires speculated that Moyzisch may not have known that Bazna was still alive. Franz von Papen and Allen Dulles, wartime head of the OSS, suggested that there was more to the story than what had emerged in the book. Neither elaborated. Twelve years later, in 1962, I was Cicero was published by 'Cicero' himself.

A film based on the book Operation Cicero by L.C. Moyzisch was released by 20th Century Fox in 1952. It was titled 5 Fingers and directed by Joseph L. Mankiewicz. Bazna, renamed Ulysses Diello, was played by James Mason.

Later years
Moyzisch returned to Austria where he wrote his book and worked as a businessman.

Notes

Online references
picture of Ludwig Carl Moyzisch

References

Officials of Nazi Germany
German diplomats
1905 births
Diplomats from Vienna
World War II spies for Germany
Year of death missing
Commercial attachés